Thomas Schrammel (born 5 September 1987) is an Austrian football player. He plays as a defender.

References

1987 births
Living people
Austrian footballers
Austria international footballers
Association football defenders
SV Ried players
SK Rapid Wien players
FC Lustenau players
FC Wacker Innsbruck (2002) players
SK Sturm Graz players
People from Neusiedl am See District
Austrian Football Bundesliga players
Footballers from Burgenland